Philip Noel Johnson (born 1964) is a former armored car driver employed by Loomis Fargo & Company in Jacksonville, Florida. He is notable for the theft of 18.8 million dollars, at the time the largest heist ever pulled off.

Robbery
On March 29, 1997, Johnson pulled off what was then the largest cash heist in U.S. history, taking $18.8 million ($29.2 million today) from the armored vehicle he was driving. Johnson overpowered two of his co-workers and left them handcuffed in different locations. He stashed most of the $18.8 million in a storage shed in Mountain Home, North Carolina, and moved to Mexico City.

On August 30, 1997, a U.S. Customs Agent at a border crossing from Mexico pulled a passenger from a bus bound for Houston, Texas, suspicious of his responses to her questions. Upon further investigation the agent found the identification offered by the passenger to be a known alias for Johnson, and he was arrested when multiple passports were found in his possession.

Independent of Johnson's apprehension, investigators were already following a trail of clues that led to the North Carolina storage shed on September 18, 1997. Approximately $18 million was recovered from the shed. Johnson was subsequently convicted and sentenced to 25 years in prison.

Johnson was released from prison October 3, 2019.

The robbery was featured in an episode of Daring Capers.

See also
 List of large value US robberies

References

External links

 
 

Robberies in the United States
Crimes in Florida
1997 in Florida
1997 crimes in the United States
Loomis Fargo robbery
20th century in Jacksonville, Florida